Michelle or Michele Johnson may refer to:

 Michelle Johnson (actress) (born 1965), American actress
 Michelle D. Johnson, United States Air Force Lieutenant General
 Michelle Johnson (athlete) (born 1974), American hurdler, in 1999 World Championships in Athletics – Women's 400 metres hurdles
 Michelle Johnson (born 1968), the birth name of singer Meshell Ndegeocello
 Michelle Johnson, convicted of the Murder of Erica Green